Golden Delicious is a Canadian coming-of-age drama film, directed by Jason Karman and released in 2022. The film stars Cardi Wong as Jake, a Chinese Canadian teenager who must confront the expectations of his family when he joins the school basketball team in a bid to get closer to his classmate Aleks (Chris Carson), with whom he has fallen in love.

The cast also includes Parmiss Sehat, Ryan Mah, Leeah Wong, Claudia Kai, Jesse Hyde, Hunter Dillon, Zavien Garrett, Jeff Joseph, Kameron Louangxay, Cole Howard and David Kaye.

The film premiered in the Northern Lights program at the 2022 Vancouver International Film Festival.

Awards
The film was longlisted for the Directors Guild of Canada's 2022 Jean-Marc Vallée DGC Discovery Award. It won four awards at the 2022 Reelworld Film Festival, for Outstanding Feature Film, Outstanding Director of a Feature Film (Karman), Outstanding Actor in a Feature Film (Wong) and Outstanding Writer of a Feature Film (Gorrman Lee).

References

External links 
 

2022 films
2022 drama films
2022 LGBT-related films
Canadian coming-of-age drama films
Canadian basketball films
Canadian sports drama films
Canadian LGBT-related films
Canadian independent films
Films about Chinese Canadians
LGBT-related sports drama films
LGBT-related coming-of-age films
Films shot in Vancouver
Films set in Vancouver
2022 directorial debut films
English-language Canadian films
2020s Canadian films